David William Frederick Lodge (19 August 1921 – 18 October 2003) was an English character actor.

Career 

During the Second World War, Lodge served in the RAF. Before turning to acting he worked as a circus clown. He also appeared in Gang Shows and variety before making his screen debut in The Cockleshell Heroes and going on to feature in many British films usually portraying military types, and often comedic roles.

He was a close friend of Peter Sellers and appeared as part of Spike Milligan's team on his Q programmes (a running gag being that in each episode he or Spike would mention his role in The Cockleshell Heroes).

Lodge was very prolific during the 1950s and in 1958 alone he appeared in ten films.

He appeared in a 1969 episode of Randall and Hopkirk Deceased ("Who Killed Cock Robin?"), and continuing with his military-type roles as Company Sergeant-Major Sharp in an episode of It Ain't Half Hot Mum in 1976. Lodge appeared in Carry On England. He played the role of drunk Captain Bull who is replaced as Captain of the Battery by Captain S. Melly (Kenneth Connor).

He appeared in five Carry On films and several of the TV series episodes. He appeared as a policeman in the opening episode of the legal drama The Main Chance and again in a later episode. He also appeared in two of the On the Buses films playing smaller roles.

Lodge appeared as 'Pop Garret' in episode 1 series 2 Chalk and Cheese of The Sweeney, and as 'Soldier Atkins' in the Minder episode Rocky Eight and a Half (both characters being boxing trainers). He was a member of the Grand Order of Water Rats, and served as its "King Rat".

Selected filmography

 Orders Are Orders (1954) as Bit Role (uncredited)
 The Cockleshell Heroes (1955) as Marine Ruddock
 Private's Progress (1956) as Lance Corporal Parsons (uncredited)
 Women Without Men (1956) as Patrick
 The Intimate Stranger (1956) as Police Sgt. Brown
 The Long Arm (1956) as Detective Car Lot. (uncredited)
 The Counterfeit Plan (1957) as Sam Watson
 These Dangerous Years (1957) as Sgt. Lockwood
 Strangers' Meeting (1957) as Fred
 The Naked Truth (1957) as Constable Johnson
 The Silent Enemy (1958) as Sergeant
 Scotland Yard (1958, Episode: "The James Case") as Inspector Travers
 The Safecracker (1958) as Parachute Instructor
 No Time to Die (1958) as Maj. Fred Patterson, Australian POW
 Up the Creek (1958) as Scouse
 Ice Cold in Alex (1958) as C.M.P. Captain (Tank Trap)
 Girls at Sea (1958) as Cpl. Duckett
 I Was Monty's Double (1958) as Sergeant R.A.P.C.
 Further Up the Creek (1958) as Scouse
 I Only Arsked! (1958) as Sergeant Potty Chambers
 Idol on Parade (1959) as Shorty
 Life in Emergency Ward 10 (1959) as Mr. Phillips
 Yesterday's Enemy (1959) as Perkins
 Bobbikins (1959) as Hargreave – Investigator from Scotland Yard
 The Ugly Duckling (1959) as Peewee
 I'm All Right Jack (1959) as Card Player
 The Running Jumping & Standing Still Film (1959) (uncredited)
 Two-Way Stretch (1960) as Jelly Knight
 Jazz Boat (1960) as Holy Mike
 The League of Gentlemen (1960) as C.S.M.
 Never Let Go (1960) as Cliff
 Watch Your Stern (1960) as Security sergeant
 The Bulldog Breed (1960) as CPO Knowles
 The Hellfire Club (1961) as Timothy
 Carry On Regardless (1961) as Wine Connoisseur
 No My Darling Daughter (1961) as Flanigan
 Raising the Wind (1961) as Taxi Driver
 Mrs. Gibbons' Boys (1962) as Frank Gibbons
 Go to Blazes (1962) as Sergeant
 The Pirates of Blood River (1962) as Smith
 Captain Clegg (1962) as Navy Bosun
 The Boys (1962) as Mr. Herne
 Kill or Cure (1962) as Richards – Male Nurse
 The Dock Brief (1962) as Frank Bateson the Lodger
 On the Beat (1962) as Insp. Hobson
 Two Left Feet (1963) as Bill
 The Long Ships (1964) as Olla
 Saturday Night Out (1964) as Arthur
 A Shot in the Dark (1964) as Georges Duval
 Guns at Batasi (1964) as Sgt. 'Muscles' Dunn
 The Amorous Adventures of Moll Flanders (1965) as Ship's captain
 Catch Us If You Can (1965) as Louis
 The Intelligence Men (1965) as Stage Manager
 San Ferry Ann (1965) as Dad
 Cup Fever (1965) as Mr. Bates
 The Alphabet Murders (1965) as Sergeant
 The Early Bird (1965) as Angry Husband (uncredited)
 The Wrong Box (1966) as Corpse Remover (uncredited)
 The Sandwich Man (1966) as Charlie
 After the Fox as Corpse Remover (uncredited)
 Press for Time (1966) as Mr. Ross (editor, 'Tinmouth Times')
 Casino Royale (1967) (uncredited)
 Smashing Time (1967) as The Caretaker
 Seven Times Seven (1968) as Police Sergeant
 Only When I Larf (1968) 
 Corruption (1968) as Groper
 Headline Hunters (1968) as Harry
 The Fixer (1968) as Zhitnyak
 What's Good for the Goose (1969) as Porter
 Crooks and Coronets (1969) as Policeman
 Oh! What a Lovely War (1969) as Recruiting Sergeant at Music Hall
 The Smashing Bird I Used to Know (1969) as Richard Johnson
 The Magic Christian (1969) as Ship's Guide
 Incense for the Damned (1970) as Colonel
 Scream and Scream Again (1970) as Detective Inspector Phil Strickland (credit only)
 Eyewitness (1970) as Local Policeman 
 Hoffman (1970) as Foreman
 Toomorrow (1970) as 1st Policeman (uncredited)
 Scramble (1970) (uncredited)
 The Railway Children (1970) as Bandmaster
 On the Buses (1971) as Busman
 The Magnificent Seven Deadly Sins (1971) as Guest Appearance (segment "Sloth")
 The Fiend (1972) as C.I.D. Inspector
 Nobody Ordered Love (1972) as Sergeant
 Mutiny on the Buses (1972) as Safari Guard
 Raising the Roof (1972) as Manager
 Hide and Seek (1972) as Baker
 The Amazing Mr. Blunden (1972) as Mr. Wickens
 Go for a Take (1972) as Graham
 Charley One-Eye (1973) as Colonel (uncredited)
 Carry On Girls (1973) as Police Inspector
 Ghost in the Noonday Sun (1973) as Zante
 QB VII (1974) as Sgt. Flory
 Carry On Dick (1974) as Bullock
 The Return of the Pink Panther (1975) as Mac
 Carry On Behind (1975) as Landlord
 Carry On England (1976) as Captain Bull
 Sahara (1983) as Ewing
 Bloodbath at the House of Death (1984) as Inspector Goule
 Edge of Sanity (1989) as Underwood

References

External links 
 
Obituary

English male television actors
English male film actors
People from Rochester, Kent
Deaths from cancer in England
1921 births
2003 deaths
Male actors from Kent
Military personnel from Kent
Royal Air Force personnel of World War II